Napp Pharmaceuticals Limited is a private pharmaceutical company in Cambridge, United Kingdom that was founded in 1923 and bought by the Sackler family in 1966. Headquartered together with the related Napp Research Centre in the Cambridge Science Park since the 1980's, it is a sister company of Purdue Pharma and Mundipharma, all of which are owned by the descendants of Mortimer and Raymond Sackler.

Products
The company produces an array of pharmaceutical products, many for pain management, among them branded forms of oxycodone that have been identified as key drugs in the opioid epidemic.

In the early 1970s, scientists at Napp developed a delivery system whereby a pill would slowly absorbed by the body, thereby continuously delivering a drug over a 12 hour period. This Continus® delivery system was used by Purdue first to introduce MS Continus in 1987 and Oxycontin eight years later.

1995 chemical plant explosion 
At 7:50 AM on April 22, 1995, the chemical plant run by Napp Pharmaceuticals in the New Jersey town of Lodi exploded, causing four fatalities and a serious fire that injured over 40 others. The incident caused the evacuation of over 400 residents.

The cause of the explosion was found to be incorrectly mixed chemicals used for gold plating consumer electronics. Sodium hydrosulfite and aluminum powder were added to a large vat, but a pipe blockage prevented the next step. While clearing the blockage, water was somehow introduced to the vat, reacting with the chemicals within. A reaction began, increasing the temperature and pressure inside the vat as a noxious odour was noticed by employees, prompting the evacuation 24 hours later. 

Aware of the danger posed after consulting a company chemist, managers at the plant ordered seven workers to re-enter the plant and attempt to empty the vat of some of the chemicals. This intervention came too late however as the vat exploded, instantly killing three of the seven workers, with the other three seriously injured and one dying in the hospital a week later. The blast and fire caused injuries to 40 people.

A federal investigation eventually fined Napp $127,000 for numerous safety violations. Manslaughter charges were considered, but ultimately state prosecutors declined to press criminal charges.

References

External links
Official Website
Nova Pharmacy

Pharmaceutical companies of England
1923 establishments in England
Companies based in Cambridge
Sackler family